Hildegard Sellhuber (later Hildegard Zimmermann, born 7 July 1950) is a retired German speed skater. She competed at the 1968 Winter Olympics in the 500, 1000 and 1500 m events and finished in 21st, 16th and 9th place, respectively. She won West German all-around titles in 1966 and 1967.

She married Gerd Zimmermann, a West German speed skater who also competed at the 1968 Olympics.

Personal bests:
500 m – 46.5 (1968)
 1000 m – 1:36.6 (1968)
 1500 m – 2:27.5 (1968)
 3000 m – 5:27.4 (1968)

References

1950 births
German female speed skaters
Speed skaters at the 1968 Winter Olympics
Olympic speed skaters of West Germany
People from Traunstein (district)
Sportspeople from Upper Bavaria
Living people